T-Mobile Netherlands BV is the largest mobile phone company in the Netherlands. It was owned by Deutsche Telekom before being sold to WP/AP Telecom Holdings IV B.V., a joint venture between Warburg Pincus and Apax Partners. It still licences the T-Mobile brand name from Deutsche Telekom. As of August 2020, it has 5.7 million customers.

History 

Deutsche Telekom entered the Dutch market by the acquisition of Ben on 20 September 2002. In 2007, T-Mobile Netherlands, a wholly owned subsidiary of T-Mobile International, acquired Orange Netherlands from France Télécom for EUR 1.33 billion. This made it the third largest mobile telephone operator in the country behind KPN and VodafoneZiggo. Prior to its 2019 merger, Tele2 Netherlands used to use T-Mobile's infrastructure for the old 3G and 2G bands, as it only had a licence for the 4G band. 

On September 7th, 2021, T-Mobile Netherlands was purchased by WP/AP Telecom Holdings IV B.V.; a joint venture between Warburg Pincus and Apax Partners. The transaction stood at 5.1 billion euros gaining full control of the company from the former shareholders of Deutsche Telekom and Tele2.

Capacity problems 
T-Mobile announced in May 2010 that it was dealing with major capacity problems on its 3G network. T-Mobile admitted the problems after much pressure from customers and the Dutch media. T-Mobile could not keep up with the growing data demand from smartphones, caused by the number of new customers who wanted an iPhone: T-Mobile in the Netherlands failed to keep up with the demand, and capacity problems on the network were the result. T-Mobile denied the problems at first by telling complaining customers that their mobile phone or SIM-card was causing the problem.

The capacity problems occurred mostly in cities and densely populated areas. When affected, people could experience problems with calling or receiving calls, text messaging (SMS), or data services. A substantial number of customers were not able to use any of these services in cities or urban areas when the network capacity was overloaded, for instance, the cities of Amsterdam and Utrecht were heavily impacted.

After being put under pressure by several consumer interest groups and the Dutch media, T-Mobile started a cash-back settlement for all consumers who had complained about failing communication services.

T-Mobile invested tens of millions of euros to upgrade its network. The upgrade was completed around the end of the first quarter of 2011.

Acquisition of Vodafone Thuis 

In August 2016, after Ziggo and Vodafone Netherlands announced their merger, the European Commission required Vodafone to split of their fixed-line Internet business, as a condition to approve the merger. T-Mobile Netherlands reached an agreement to acquire Vodafone Thuis in November 2016, taking over their 150,000 customers. The deal was completed in December 2016. The service was rebranded T-Mobile Thuis on 15 February 2017.

Acquisition of Tele2 Netherlands 

In December 2017, T-Mobile announced its intent to buy Tele2 Netherlands. After a delay because of a European Commission investigation, the merger was completed in January 2019.

IPTV TV service Knippr 
On 9 Juni 2016 T-mobile Netherlands launched IPTV TV service Knippr in the Netherlands, after 2 years on 1 Juni 2018 the service has been stopped due to the lack of customers.

References

External links 
  
 List of channels on T-Mobile Thuis

Mobile phone companies of the Netherlands
Deutsche Telekom